Shinola, Vol. 1 is a compilation album by the American rock band Ween.  Released by Chocodog on July 19, 2005, Shinola is a collection of odds and ends that the band put together over the years.

All of the songs on this album were previously released in demo form in some way or another.  "Did You See Me?" was originally recorded for The Mollusk but was not released until it appeared on this album. "The Rift" and "Gabrielle" appeared in the 1992 Chocolate and Cheese demos. "Tastes Good on Th' Bun" appeared in The Pod demos of 1990. "I Fell in Love Today" and "Someday" appear in Quebec'''s Caesar Demos, which would not be released until 2011. "Boys Club", "Israel" and "Transitions" have appeared in demo form on various other tapes. "Big Fat Fuck", "How High Can You Fly", and "Monique the Freak" were on the band's self-released Internet album Craters of the Sac. All of those songs were changed for this release. "How High Can You Fly" went from a running time of 1:47 on Craters to a running time of 2:41 on this album. "Big Fat Fuck" went from a running time of 7:09 on Craters to a running time of 2:57 on this album. Last, "Monique the Freak" went from the running time of 10:17 on Craters, to 5:49 on Shinola''. Not many lyrics are different between the two releases, just longer instrumental parts.

The album gets its title from the colloquial phrase "You don't know shit from Shinola".

Track listing
All tracks written by Ween.

Personnel
Produced/mixed by Andrew Weiss and Ween.
Written and performed by Dean and Gene Ween.
Art direction, design by Aaron Tanner.
Mastered by Emily Lazar.

References

2005 albums
Ween albums